Isla del Frío is a small uninhabited island off the southern coast of Puerto Rico.  Together with Caja de Muertos, Gatas, Morrillito, Ratones, Cardona, and Isla de Jueyes, Isla del Frío is one of seven islands ascribed to the municipality of Ponce.  Like Isla de Jueyes, the island is considered part of barrio Vayas.

Location
The closest populated point on the mainland is Hacienda Villa Esperanza, located in barrio Vayas; however the closest geographic point on the mainland is barrio Capitanejo in Ponce. The island has an area of 2.89 cuerdas (one cuerda equals 0.97 acres). It is located at latitude 17.96444° and longitude -66.55639°.

Geography and climate
The island is a small 6-foot flat-topped island and consists mostly of brush. The climate is dry and the island supports dry forest.

Nature reserve
Though not officially a nature reserve, the island is administered by the Puerto Rico Department of Natural and Environmental Resources.

References

Uninhabited islands of Puerto Rico
Islands of Ponce, Puerto Rico